Pico Cristóbal Colón, Colombia
 Pico Simón Bolívar
 Ritacuba Blanco
 Nevado del Huila
 Nevado del Ruiz
 Nevado del Tolima
 Pico Pan de Azucar
 Santa Isabel
 Nevado Cumbal
 Nevado del Quindío
 Puracé
 Nevado El Cisne
 Cerro Negro de Mayasquer
 Galeras
 Azufral
 Picacho Mountain

Colombia
 
mountains
Colombia